The Women's Javelin throw at the 2013 Asian Athletics Championships was held at the Shree Shiv Chhatrapati Sports Complex on 6 July.

Medalists

Records

Schedule

Results
The final was held at 16:45 local time.

References

2013 Asian Athletics Championships
Javelin throw at the Asian Athletics Championships
2013 in women's athletics